Eupithecia tamarugalis is a moth in the family Geometridae. It is found in the Pampa del Tamarugal in Chile.

The length of the forewings is about 7 mm for males.

The larvae feed on Prosopis tamarugo.

Etymology
The specific name is based on the type locality.

References

Moths described in 2005
tamarugalis
Moths of South America
Endemic fauna of Chile